United Nations Security Council resolution 1326, adopted without a vote on 31 October 2000, after examining the application of Federal Republic of Yugoslavia for membership in the United Nations, the Council recommended to the General Assembly that Yugoslavia be admitted.

In 2003, the Federal Republic of Yugoslavia was continued as Serbia and Montenegro. After Montenegro became an sovereign state in 2006, the United Nations member of Serbia and Montenegro was continued as the Republic of Serbia. Thus, Serbia is the successor state to the Federal Republic of Yugoslavia (and Serbia and Montenegro) in the United Nations.

See also
 Breakup of Yugoslavia
 Enlargement of the United Nations
 Member states of the United Nations
 List of United Nations Security Council Resolutions 1301 to 1400 (2000–2002)
 United Nations Security Council Resolution 821

References

External links
 
Text of the Resolution at undocs.org

 1326
Foreign relations of Montenegro
Foreign relations of Serbia
 1326
Serbia and Montenegro
 1326
October 2000 events